Synaptolaemus is a genus of headstanders native to South America, where found in the Orinoco, Casiquiare and Amazon Basin. Synaptolaemus are elongate in shape and overall black with contrasting red, orange or yellow stripes.

Species
There are currently two recognized species in this genus according to FishBase, but an examination of specimens has shown that S. cingulatus is a synonym of S. latofasciatus.

Synaptolaemus cingulatus G. S. Myers & Fernández-Yépez, 1950
Synaptolaemus latofasciatus (Steindachner, 1910)

References

Anostomidae
Taxa named by George S. Myers
Taxa named by Augustín Fernández-Yépez